The 2009–10 Ukrainian First League was the nineteenth since its establishment. There were 18 teams competing. Two teams were relegated from the 2008–09 Ukrainian Premier League. Three teams were promoted from the 2008–09 Ukrainian Second League. Due to the 2009 flu pandemic which affected Ukraine in late October the PFL decide to break for winter earlier than they originally scheduled. The second half of the season began March 11, 2010.

Teams

Promoted teams
These three teams were promoted from Druha Liha at the start of the season:
Group A
Nyva Ternopil – Druha Liha champion (Returning after seven seasons)
Arsenal Bila Tserkva - Playoff Winner (Debut)

Group B
Zirka Kirovohrad – Druha Liha champion (Returning after six seasons)

Relegated teams 
Two teams were relegated from the Ukrainian Premier League 2008–09 season

 FC Lviv – 15th place (Returning after a season)
 FC Kharkiv – 16th place (Previously as FC Arsenal Kharkiv)

Map
The following displays the location of teams.

Playoff game 
Prior to the beginning of the season FC Ihroservice Simferopol failed to pay their license dues for the season. To allow an extra team to be promoted, the PFL determined that a playoff game between the 2nd placed teams from Druha Liha –
Arsenal Bila Tserkva and FC Poltava would determine the vacancy. This playoff game was played July 12, 2009.

Final standings

Results

Top scorers

Managers

Managerial changes

Stadiums
The following stadiums were used during the season.

See also 
2009–10 Ukrainian Premier League
2009–10 Ukrainian Second League

References

External links 
  Professional Football League of Ukraine – website of the professional football league of Ukraine
  Football agency S.V.S.: statistic information

Ukrainian First League seasons
2009–10 in Ukrainian association football leagues
Ukra